Hřebečníky is a municipality and village in Rakovník District in the Central Bohemian Region of the Czech Republic. It has about 200 inhabitants.

Administrative parts
Villages of Novosedly, Šlovice, Týřovice and Újezdec are administrative parts of Hřebečníky.

References

Villages in Rakovník District